The Milwaukee Chicks were a women's professional baseball team which played in the All-American Girls Professional Baseball League during the  season.  They were managed by Max Carey, former star player for the Pittsburgh Pirates and Brooklyn Robins and a future Hall of Famer.

They were also known colloquially as the "Brewettes", after the city's established baseball team, and the "Schnitts" (a term for glass of beer served half-full).

History

By 1944 the AAGPBL added the Milwaukee Chicks and the Minneapolis Millerettes to the league's roster. The Chicks were a well balanced squad  that counted with talented players as Josephine Kabick, Merle Keagle, Connie Wisniewski and Alma Ziegler. With Max Carey at the helm, the Chicks led the league in runs scored (492), batting average (.207), stolen bases (739) and tied for first in home runs (12). The best offensive support came from Keagle, who hit .264 with 47 runs batted in, and led the AAGPBL hitters with seven home runs and 145 total bases. The one-two pitching staff was led by Kabick, who posted a 26–19 record for a .578 winning percentage and topped the league in wins and innings pitched (366), while Wisniewski went 23-10 (.697) with a 2.23 earned run average. A daring base runner, Ziegler established at second base as a flashy defender who made outstandings plays routinely, being considered the spark plug of the team.

The Chicks went 30–26 in the first half of the year, but dominated the second half (40-19) and had the best overall record (70-45). They then went on to win the Championship Title, beating the Kenosha Comets in the postseason. During the seven-game series Wisniewski went 4–1 with a 0.40 ERA in five complete games, including two shutouts, two one-run games and one two-run game, winning three of four matchups with Kenosha's Helen Nicol, who finished with a 17–11 mark (.607) and had led the league with a minuscule 0.93 ERA.

Although the Chicks won the AAGPBL championship title, they had no local financial backing and could not compete with the  American Association Milwaukee Brewers. In fact, the Chicks were forced to play all seven games of the series at Kenosha's Lake Front Stadium because the Brewers were using the Borchert Field in Milwaukee. In addition, the high ticket prices charged for AAGPBL games failed to encourage significant fan support. Due to lack of community support and skepticism of journalists, the Chicks moved to Grand Rapids, Michigan prior to the 1945 season.

On August 27, 2000, the surviving Chicks were honored by the Milwaukee Brewers before a game against the San Diego Padres.

The Brewers celebrated the Chicks' 75th Anniversary in 2019 with a special theme night, including a reproduction 1944 baseball cap giveaway.  Mayor Tom Barrett declared the same day, June 29, 2019 as "The Milwaukee Chicks Day" throughout the city of Milwaukee.

Tributes to the club may be found in American Family Field.

All-time roster

Vivian Anderson  Third base
Kay Blumetta  Outfield / First base
Max Carey  Manager
Clara Cook  Pitcher
Gladys Davis Shortstop / Outfield
Thelma Eisen  Outfield
Josephine Figlo  Outfield
Olga Grant Outfield
Dottie Hunter  Chaperon
Josephine Kabick  Pitcher
Marie Kazmierczak  Outfield
Merle Keagle  Outfield / Third base/ Pitcher 
Dolores Klosowski  First base / Pitcher
Dorothy Maguire  Catcher / Outfield
Vickie Panos  Outfield
Ernestine Petras  Shortstop
LaFerne Price  Infield / Pitcher
Shirley Schulze  Outfield
Mary Shastal Second base
Emily Stevenson  Catcher / Outfield
Doris Tetzlaff  Third base
Viola Thompson Pitcher
Betty Whiting  First base / Catcher / Outfield
Connie Wisniewski  Pitcher / Outfield
Sylvia Wronski  Pitcher
Alma Ziegler  Second base / Pitcher / Shortstop

References

All-American Girls Professional Baseball League teams
1944 establishments in Wisconsin
1944 disestablishments in Wisconsin
Baseball teams established in 1944
Baseball teams disestablished in 1944
Defunct baseball teams in Wisconsin
Baseball in Milwaukee
Women's sports in Wisconsin